He Xiehou (1873-1961) was a Chinese educator, politician and former President of Peking University.

Biography

He's another name was He Yushi (何燏时), courtesy name was Zixing (字行), and was born in Zhuji, Shaoxing, Zhejiang Province in 1873. When he was 19 years old, he went to Hangzhou and in 1897 studied at Qiushi Academy (current Zhejiang University).

In 1898, He went to Japan, as one of China's first students to Japan. In 1902, He graduated from Tokyo First Advanced School (Japanese: 第一高等学校). In 1907, He graduated from the Department of Metallurgy of Tokyo Imperial University (current University of Tokyo). He is the first Chinese student who graduated from a Japanese university.

In spring 1908, He went back to Zhejiang and served as a technician in the Bureau of Mining of Zhejiang Provincial Government. In 1909, he went to Japan again. He was the supervisor of the engineering faculty of the Imperial Capital University (京师大学堂; current Peking University) in Beijing.

In 1911/1912, the Qing Dynasty ended, and the Imperial Capital University was renamed as (National) Peking University. He was the first President of Peking University from then on. 

In 1914, he visited South Asia. 

In 1954, he was elected the head of the Revolutionary Committee of the Kuomintang Zhejiang Branch. 

In 1961, he died in Hangzhou. His tomb is in Shaoxing, his hometown. Many people still visit there today.

References

External links
 Presidents of Peking University
 He Xiehou's biography (from Zhejiang Local Archive)
 Sohu.com Education: He Xiehou - a former Peking University President forgotten by history
 Sohu.com Education: Former residence and tomb of He Xiehou in Zhuji
 Shaoxing Government: He Xiehou's biography

1863 births
1961 deaths
Politicians from Shaoxing
Academic staff of Peking University
University of Tokyo alumni
Zhejiang University alumni
Educators from Shaoxing
Presidents of Peking University
People's Republic of China politicians from Zhejiang